Qibleh may refer to:
 Qibla, the Muslim direction for prayer
 Qiblih, a Bahá'í direction for prayer

See also
 Qebleh (disambiguation)